The 2004–05 season was the 85th season in the existence of FC Istres and the club's first season back in the top flight of French football. In addition to the domestic league, Istres participated in this season's edition of the Coupe de France and the Coupe de la Ligue. The season covered the period from 1 July 2004 to 30 June 2005.

First-team squad
Squad at end of season

Left club during season

Competitions

Overall record

Ligue 1

League table

Results summary

Results by round

Matches

Coupe de France

Coupe de la Ligue

Notes and references

Notes

References

Istres
FC Istres seasons